The men's 100 metres sprint event at the 1972 Olympic Games in Munich, West Germany, was held at Olympiastadion on 31 August and 1 September. Eighty-five athletes from 55 nations competed. Each nation was limited to 3 athletes per rules in force since the 1930 Olympic Congress. The event was won by Valeriy Borzov of the Soviet Union, the first medal in the men's 100 metres for that nation. Jamaican Lennox Miller, silver medalist four years earlier, became the second man to make the podium twice in the event by taking bronze (after Ralph Metcalfe in 1932 and 1936).

This event is notable for the absence of favourites and world record holders Eddie Hart and Rey Robinson from their quarterfinal heats due to American sprint coach Stan Wright being given the wrong starting time. The three qualified American athletes, Robinson, Hart and Robert Taylor, were at the ABC television headquarters watching what they believed were replays of their morning preliminary races before being informed they were watching live coverage of the races they were scheduled to run in. The athletes rushed to the stadium, but Hart and Robinson, scheduled in the first two races, missed their heats, while Robert Taylor hurried to take off his warm up uniform before running his  heat. An appeal by American officials to have Robinson and Hart run in another heat was rejected.

Background

This was the seventeenth time the event was held, having appeared at every Olympics since the first in 1896. Two finalists from 1968 returned: Lennox Miller of Jamaica and Jean-Louis Ravelomanantsoa of Madagascar. The favourite was Soviet Valeriy Borzov, the European champion. The American team was missing John Carlos, who had turned to professional football, but still had strong runners in Eddie Hart and Rey Robinson, who had matched the world record of 9.9 seconds in the U.S. Olympic trials, and Robert Taylor.

Thirteen nations appeared in the event for the first time: Bolivia, Cambodia (then Khmer Republic), Chad, Kuwait, Lesotho, Malawi, Mongolia, Paraguay, Saudi Arabia, Sri Lanka, Upper Volta, the Virgin Islands, and Zambia (though Northern Rhodesia had competed previously). The United States was the only nation to have appeared at each of the first seventeen Olympic men's 100 metres events.

Competition format
The event retained the same basic four round format introduced in 1920: heats, quarterfinals, semifinals, and a final. It also expanded the "fastest loser" system, introduced in 1968, to include the quarterfinals as well as the preliminary heats.

The first round consisted of 12 heats, each with 6–8 athletes. The top three runners in each heat advanced, along with the next four fastest runners overall. This made 40 quarterfinalists, who were divided into five heats of 8 runners. The top three runners in each quarterfinal advanced, along with the single fastest fourth-place finisher. The 16 semifinalists competed in two heats of 8, with the top four in each semifinal advancing to the eight-man final.

Records

Prior to the competition, the existing world and Olympic records were as follows.

No records were set in the event at the 1972 Games.

Results

Heats

The top three runners in each of the twelve heats, and the next fastest four, advanced to the quarterfinal round.

Heat 1

Heat 2

Heat 3

Heat 4

The tailwind of 2.3 m/s made this heat ineligible for records purposes.

Heat 5

Heat 6

Heat 7

Heat 8

The tailwind of 2.10 m/s made this heat ineligible for records purposes.

Heat 9

Heat 10

Heat 11

Heat 12

Quarterfinals

The top three runners in each of the five heats and the next fastest one, advanced to the semifinal round.

Quarterfinal 1

Hart failed to appear due to a scheduling change and coaching error.

Quarterfinal 2

Robinson failed to appear due to a scheduling change and coaching error.

Quarterfinal 3

Quarterfinal 4

The tailwind of 3.40 m/s made this heat ineligible for records purposes.

Quarterfinal 5

Semifinals

The top four runners in each of the two heats advanced to the final round.

Semifinal 1

Papageorgopoulos was forced to scratch after he pulled a groin muscle in the quarter-finals.

Semifinal 2

Final

Borzov "won fairly easily."

Wind speed =

References
3. Die Spiele, The official report of the Organizing Committee for the Games of the XXth Olympiad Munich 1972, Volume 3 The competitions, page 49. 

Athletics at the 1972 Summer Olympics
100 metres at the Olympics
Men's events at the 1972 Summer Olympics